The United Congregational Church in Southern Africa began with the work of the London Missionary Society, who sent missionaries like Dr. Theodorus van der Kemp to the Cape colony in 1799. He was established the first Congregational church in Cape Town in 1801. LMS missionaries like David Livingstone spread the Gospel among the Batswana and Amandbele peoples. After 1820 English and Welsh settlers established their own congregational congregations. Congregationalist missionaries from the American Board of Commissioners for Foreign Missions began work in KwaZulu-Natal in 1830, and several congregations of white settlers formed the Congregational Union of South Africa. These three bodies united to form the United Congregational Church of Southern Africa in 1967.

It has approximately 500,000 members in 450 local congregations.

The United Congregational Church is a member of the World Communion of Reformed Churches.

It has a Synod in Mozambique, its office is located in Maputo. The Igreja Congregacional Unida do Africa do Sul in Portuguese had 13,400 members in 27 congregations. It traces back their origin to the first evangelist Rev. Edwin Richards sent in 1880 to Mozambique by the American Board of Commissioners for Foreign Missions. Later the mission decided to close the work, Richards and most members followed joined the Methodist church. Small part maintained the congregational heritage. Congregations located in Inhambane, Gaza, Maputo. Official languages are Portuguese, Xitxe, Tsonga and Tyopi.

There are 51 congregations in Botswana with more than 20,300 members. In Botswana the UCCSA is a member of the Botswana Council of Churches.

In Zimbabwe it runs several schools and as of 1995 the Congregational Church had 160 congregations and 11,000 communicant members and 16,700 adherents.

The Namibia Regional Council of the denomination has 3,000 members and 7 congregations in Duineveld, Rehoboth, Karlfeld, Windhoek, Luderitz, Walvis Bay, Swakopmund, Grootfrontein. Since 1933 congregational people begun moving to Namibia. In 1982 these congregations formed this independent regional council.

References

External links
 UCCSA home page

Protestantism in South Africa
Members of the World Communion of Reformed Churches
Members of the World Council of Churches
Christian organizations established in 1967
Reformed denominations in Africa
Congregational denominations established in the 20th century
1967 establishments in South Africa